Aleksandr Yurievich Vinogradov (Russian: Александр Юрьевич Виноградов, born 10 November 1951) is a retired Russian sprint canoeist. He competed in doubles at the 1976 and 1980 Olympics and won two gold medals in 1976. He also won five medals at the ICF Canoe Sprint World Championships with three golds (C-2 500 m: 1974, 1975; C-2 10000 m: 1971), one silver (C-2 500 m: 1979, and one bronze (C-2 1000 m: 1975).

References

External links

1951 births
Canoeists at the 1976 Summer Olympics
Canoeists at the 1980 Summer Olympics
Living people
Russian male canoeists
Soviet male canoeists
Olympic canoeists of the Soviet Union
Olympic gold medalists for the Soviet Union
Olympic medalists in canoeing
ICF Canoe Sprint World Championships medalists in Canadian

Medalists at the 1976 Summer Olympics